Alag-Shulun (Alag Shuluun) is a rural locality (an ulus) in Okinsky District, Republic of Buryatia, Russia. The population was 168 as of 2010.

Geography 
Alag-Shulun is located 71 km northeast of Orlik (the district's administrative centre) by road. Khuzhir is the nearest rural locality.

References 

Rural localities in Okinsky District